Club Deportivo Cortes is a Spanish football team based in Cortes, in the autonomous community of Navarre. Founded in 1927, it currently plays in Tercera División – Group 15, holding home games at Estadio San Francisco Javier, which has a capacity of 1,000 people.

History 
In the 2017-18 season the club finished 8th in the Tercera División, Group 15.

Season to season

12 seasons in Tercera División

References

External links
Official website 
Arefepedia team profile 

Football clubs in Navarre
Association football clubs established in 1927
1927 establishments in Spain